Rattanawan Wamalun (born 15 July 1995) is a Thai weightlifter. She won the silver medal in the women's 64kg event at the 2022 World Weightlifting Championships held in Bogotá, Colombia.

She participated at the 2018 World Weightlifting Championships, winning a medal.

References

External links

1995 births
Living people
Rattanawan Wamalun
World Weightlifting Championships medalists
Asian Games medalists in weightlifting
Weightlifters at the 2018 Asian Games
Medalists at the 2018 Asian Games
Rattanawan Wamalun
Rattanawan Wamalun
Rattanawan Wamalun